Sabeeh Abed Ali, is a coach and former international Iraqi football player, who played for Iraq in the 1972 AFC Asian Cup qualification and 1974 FIFA World Cup qualification, he also played for Al-Minaa.

Honours

Local
Al-Mina'a
 1978 Iraqi League: Champion

International
Iraq
 1972 World Military Championships: Champion

References

External links
  Iraqi national team players database
Al-Minaa Club: Sailors of south

Iraqi footballers
Al-Mina'a SC players
Sportspeople from Basra
Iraq international footballers
Association football fullbacks
Iraqi football managers
Al-Mina'a SC managers
Year of birth missing
1980s deaths